Miquel Iceta Llorens (born 17 August 1960) is a Spanish politician and member of the Socialists' Party of Catalonia (PSC), currently serving as minister of Culture and Sport of the Spanish government since 2021 and as first secretary of the PSC since 2014. Previously, he served as minister of Territorial Policy and Civil Service from January to July 2021.

He's one of the first openly gay politicians from Spain. He has been a member of the 6th to 12th terms of the Parliament of Catalonia. He also was member of the 6th Congress of Deputies, representing Barcelona.

Biography 
Born on 17 August 1960 in Barcelona, he began studying chemistry but abandoned his studies after a year; he then enrolled as an Economics student in the Autonomous University of Barcelona (UAB), from whence he was expelled after sitting his first year five times, thus reaching the maximum amount of repeats allowed by university regulations. He then focused solely on politics. His earlier stint in the Partido Socialista Popular de Cataluña, which he had joined in September 1977, had been followed a year later by joining the Juventud Socialista de Cataluña and the Partido de los Socialistas de Cataluña (PSC).

Elected in the 1987 municipal elections, he served as a councillor in the Cornellá de Llobregat Town Hall from 1987 to 1991. A politician trusted by Narcís Serra, the latter, Vice-President of the Government, appointed him Director of the Analysis Department of the Cabinet of the Presidency of the Government, a responsibility he held from 1991 to 1995, when he became Deputy Director of the Cabinet.

Included as a candidate in number 7 of the list of the PSC to the Congress of Deputies for Barcelona in the general elections of 1996, he was elected deputy for the sixth legislature. Iceta publicly declared his homosexuality in October 1999, during the campaign for the elections to the Parliament of Catalonia in 1999; he was then considered the first Spanish politician to do so. Elected as a regional deputy in the October 1999 elections, his resignation from the Congress of Deputies became effective on November 2, 1999.

In July 2008, he became a member of the Federal Executive Committee of the PSOE. He was a member of the paper for the reform of the current Statute of Autonomy of Catalonia. In July 2014, he was elected, through primary elections and without rivals, as the new Secretary General of the PSC with 85% of the votes, replacing Pere Navarro.

On 30 June 2015 he was elected PSC candidate for the presidency of the Generalitat de Catalunya for the regional elections of 27-S, in which his party won 16 seats.

On 27 January 2021, Pedro Sánchez appointed him as minister of Territorial Policy and Civil Service of the Spanish government.

Bibliography
Diari de Campanya: les eleccions del canvi, 2003, Editorial Mediterrània (2004). 
 Catalanisme federalista, Fundació Rafael Campalans (2007). 
 Icetadari, RBA (2015). 
 La tercera vía. Puentes para el acuerdo, Los libros de la Catarata (2017). 
 Trenta anys de militància socialista, Bubok (2008)
 Idees pel debat socialista, Bubok (2010)

Further reading
 Montilla, Raúl: Iceta. El estratega del Partido Socialista, Ediciones B (2017).

References

|-

|-

|-

1960 births
First Secretaries of the Parliament of Catalonia
First Secretaries of the Socialists' Party of Catalonia
Leaders of political parties in Spain
LGBT legislators in Spain
Living people
Members of the 10th Parliament of Catalonia
Members of the 11th Parliament of Catalonia
Members of the 12th Parliament of Catalonia
Municipal councillors in the province of Barcelona
Socialists' Party of Catalonia politicians
Members of the 6th Congress of Deputies (Spain)